Functional agonist may refer to:
functional selectivity
Physiological agonism